Tazewell Historic District is a national historic district located at Tazewell, Tazewell County, Virginia. The district encompasses 112  contributing buildings in central business district and surrounding residential area of the town of Tazewell.

The most notable building is the Tazewell County Courthouse.  It was built in 1874, and rebuilt in 1913 in a Classical Revival style.  Other notable buildings include the Old Jail (c. 1832), Clinch Valley News Building, Stras Memorial Episcopal Church (1884), Tazewell Christian Church (1898), Clinch Valley Bank (1889), J. A. Greever Building (1914), Greever and Gillespie Law Office Building (1897), Tazewell High School (1931), Tazewell Masonic Lodge #62 (1931), Tazewell Post Office (1936), and Tazewell Presbyterian Church (1924, 1959).

It was listed on the National Register of Historic Places in 2002, and had a boundary increase in 2016.

References

Courthouses on the National Register of Historic Places in Virginia
Historic districts in Tazewell County, Virginia
County courthouses in Virginia
Neoclassical architecture in Virginia
Victorian architecture in Virginia
National Register of Historic Places in Tazewell County, Virginia
Historic districts on the National Register of Historic Places in Virginia